Roland Hamilton (23 November 1886 – 10 February 1953) was a Labour Party politician in the United Kingdom.

In the Labour landslide at the 1945 general election, he was elected as Member of Parliament (MP) for Sudbury in Suffolk, which had been held by the Conservative Henry Burton since the 1924 election.

The Sudbury constituency was abolished for the 1950 general election, when Hamilton stood in the new Sudbury and Woodbridge constituency.  He lost by over 4,500 votes to the Conservative John Hare, who had previously been MP for the also-abolished Woodbridge constituency.

References
UK General Election results February 1950

External links 
 

1886 births
1955 deaths
Labour Party (UK) MPs for English constituencies
UK MPs 1945–1950